

Psychoanalysis

In Freudian psychology, externalization (or externalisation) is a defense mechanism by which an individual projects their own internal characteristics onto the outside world, particularly onto other people. For example, a patient who is overly argumentative might instead perceive others as argumentative and themselves as blameless.

Like other defense mechanisms, externalization is a protection against anxiety and is, therefore, part of a healthy, normally functioning mind. However, if taken to excess, it can lead to the development of a neurosis.

Narrative therapy

Michael White states that the problem of the client is externalized, to alter the client's point of view.

See also
 Internalization

Notes

References
 
 
 
 
Defence mechanisms